The Miraculous 2020 World Tour was a planned concert tour by American Latin rock band Santana. The tour was scheduled to begin on March 14, 2020 at the Unipol Arena in Bologna, Italy. However, due to the COVID-19 pandemic, the tour was postponed until further notice on March 10, 2020. Michael Vrionis, President of Universal Tone Management, said that Santana will keep fans informed of new tour dates, but over a year later there has been no further announcements.

Overview 
The Miraculous 2020 World Tour was mentioned in January 2019, but officially announced on October 28, 2019. The tour will take place Asia, Europe, Oceania, and South America, though only the European dates have been announced as of November 2019. As well as promoting their recent album Africa Speaks, the tour also commemorates the 20th anniversary of their 1999 album Supernatural and the 50th anniversary of their second album, 1970's Abraxas. According to a press release announcing the tour, the tour's set lists will consist of "the new hymns and songs of tomorrow" from Africa Speaks.

Tour band 
 Ray Greene – lead vocals
 Andy Vargas – lead vocals
 Carlos Santana – lead guitar, percussion, vocals
 Tommy Anthony – rhythm guitar, vocals
 David K. Mathews – keyboards
 Benny Rietveld – bass guitar
 Cindy Blackman Santana – drums
 Paoli Mejías – percussion
 Karl Perazzo – timbales, percussion, vocals

Tour dates

References 

Santana (band) concert tours
2020 concert tours
Concert tours of Europe
Concert tours postponed due to the COVID-19 pandemic